DNA excision repair protein ERCC-8 is a protein that in humans is encoded by the ERCC8 gene.

This gene encodes a WD repeat protein, which interacts with the Cockayne syndrome type B (CSB) and p44 proteins, the latter being a subunit of the RNA polymerase II transcription factor II H. Mutations in this gene have been identified in patients with the hereditary disease Cockayne syndrome (CS). CS is an accelerated aging disorder characterized by photosensitivity, impaired development and multi-system progressive degeneration. The CS cells are abnormally sensitive to ultraviolet radiation and are defective in the repair of transcriptionally active genes. Multiple alternatively spliced transcript variants encoding different isoforms have been found for this gene.

CS arises from germline mutations in either of two genes CSA(ERCC8) or CSB(ERCC6). CSA mutations generally give rise to a more moderate form of CS than CSB mutations.  Mutations in the CSA gene account for about 20% of CS cases.

Function

CSA and CSB proteins are thought to function in transcription and DNA repair, most notably in transcription-coupled nucleotide excision repair.  CSA and CSB-deficient cells exhibit a lack of preferential repair of UV-induced cyclobutane pyrimidine dimers in actively transcribed genes, consistent with a failed transcription coupled nucleotide excision repair response.  Within the cell, the CSA protein localizes to sites of DNA damage, particularly inter-strand cross-links, double-strand breaks and some mono-adducts.

Interactions
ERCC8 (gene) has been shown to interact with XAB2.

References

Further reading

External links
  GeneReviews/NCBI/NIH/UW entry on Cockayne syndrome